List of AM-band radio station lists issued by the United States government is a review of the official AM-band station lists prepared by U.S. regulators.

Table information
In the United States, radio station regulation has been the responsibility of the following agencies:
 Department of Commerce (DOC) (1912–1927)
 Federal Radio Commission (FRC) (1927–1934)
 Federal Communications Commission (FCC) (1934+)

In the list below, under the Listed by heading, "Zone" refers to the five regional zones established by the provisions of the Davis Amendment, which was in force from 1928 to 1936. Under the Source heading, "RSB" refers to the Radio Service Bulletin, published until June 1932 by the Department of Commerce, from July 1932 until July 1934 by the Federal Radio Commission, and thereafter by the Federal Communications Commission. The annual issues of Commercial and Government Radio Stations of the United States were all published by the Department of Commerce.

References

AM-band radio station lists